New York’s 26th congressional district is a congressional district for the United States House of Representatives in Western New York. It includes parts of Erie and Niagara counties. The district includes the cities of Buffalo, Lackawanna, Niagara Falls, Tonawanda, and North Tonawanda.

The office of representative for this district became vacant on February 9, 2011, following the resignation of Republican Chris Lee. A special election was held May 24, 2011, and Democrat Kathy Hochul was elected. After redistricting, Brian Higgins, a Democrat, has represented the district since 2013.

Voting

History

Historically, most of this district was located Upstate, However, over the years until the 2002 redistricting, most of this area was in the 27th District. During the 1980s this area was primarily in the 31st District. Two districts covered this area in the 1970s, the Erie County-based 38th and the Monroe County based 35th.  The 26th District covered the area now in the 22nd District during the 1990s and the area now in the 23rd District during the 1980s. In the 1970s this district was centered in Orange and Rockland counties. During the 1960s it covered areas in Westchester County now in the 18th and 19th Districts.

Representatives

1823–1833: Two seats
From the creation of the district in 1823 to 1833, two seats were apportioned, elected at-large on a general ticket.

1833–present: One seat

Election results
In New York electoral politics, there are numerous minor parties at various points on the political spectrum. Certain parties will invariably endorse either the Republican or Democratic candidate for every office; hence, the state electoral results contain both the party votes, and the final candidate votes (Listed as "Recap").

See also

List of United States congressional districts
New York's congressional districts
United States congressional delegations from New York

Notes

References

 
 
 
 
 
 

26
1823 establishments in New York (state)
Constituencies established in 1823